Augmentation Industries (AI) is the corporation behind mad. mad is the abbreviation of mobile assisted driving which is a patent pending technology to connect cars to the internet. AI is a German high tech start up with its roots in the automotive M2M industry. AI has set itself the goal to "Make Cars Smarter to Ease up Everyone's Life"

Foundation
AI was founded and incorporated in April 2012 in Germany by Alexander Marten and Stephan Kaufmann. The technology idea was submitted in 2011 to the German Patent Authority and after first positive feedback it was submitted in 2012 to the European Patent Office as an international PCT application with the priority date of 2011. Since then AI has applied for now four additional international patents all in the M2M area

After a short validation phase funded by f³ (family, friends & fools), a substantial VC round for US$1,950,000 (EUR 1,500,000) was closed in August 2012. This capital laid the foundation to hire the team to bring the idea into living. Later on the company received several national subsidies and further invests. The money was used to develop the mad technology: A technology platform to retrofit cars with a small hardware adapter (size of a matchbook) enable a direct connection between the car's ECUs and a smartphone or other nomadic device as well as street infrastructure and other cars. Based on CAN data communication, the user is able to interact with the car by an app. 
Normen Müller was the first hire to complete the management team and is the CTO and IT brain of AI to develop and implement the technology. Along with five further employees and external support of another five developers and automotive engineers the company is well on its route.
The Company filed bankruptcy in March 2014

Successes

AI's customer base includes some of the biggest European insurance companies and several German mid-sized ones; multiple fleet management companies; global logistic companies and SME's value the mad based services AI has to offer.

Several corporate startup initiatives and incubators seized the opportunity to become part of mad's story:
The European Space Agency supports AI through its incubator program.
Websummit 2013 named AI as one of the exclusive 50 STARTglobal companies.
AI is also an IBM Global Entrepreneur Company and won the German SmartCamp trophy.
SAP has accepted AI into its startup.focus program centered on start ups in the big data, predictive analysis and real time decision area.
Germany's Vice Chancellor invited AI along with 29 other startups on a trip to the Silicon Valley and later in the year to Israel.
The German Research Center for Artificial Intelligence has joined AI in several research activities;
One of Germany's ivy league universities, TU Darmstadt, has partnered with AI for participation in the EU EIT ICT Labs program.
University of Heilbronn is AI's partner in the ZIM initiative.

It is AI's goal to make a dent in the automotive area by disrupting a market with the mad technology, that has not changed significantly in the past  100 years.

References

External links
 Founder's Interview
 Company Facebook Page

Technology companies of Germany